Cannock Chase is a local government district in Staffordshire, England. Its council is based in the town of Cannock; other notable towns are Rugeley, Bridgtown and Hednesford. The district covers a large part of the Cannock Chase Area of Outstanding Natural Beauty, from which it takes its name.

The district was formed on 1 April 1974 by the merger of Cannock and Rugeley urban districts, along with Brindley Heath from Lichfield Rural District, and Norton Canes from Aldridge-Brownhills Urban District. Cannock, which covers around 30% of the population, includes the parish of Bridgtown but the rest of Cannock is unparished. Until the 2010 general election the parliamentary constituency of Cannock Chase consisted of Cannock Chase district plus the adjacent village of Huntington. From 2010 onwards the constituency has exactly the same boundaries as the district.

Since 2011, Cannock Chase has formed part of both the Greater Birmingham & Solihull Local Enterprise Partnership (along with neighbouring authorities Birmingham, Bromsgrove, East Staffordshire, Lichfield, Redditch, Solihull, Tamworth and Wyre Forest), and Stoke-on-Trent and Staffordshire Local Enterprise Partnership.

Areas of Cannock Chase District

There are many villages and suburbs along with four towns in the Cannock Chase District. 

Towns:
 Bridgtown
 Cannock
 Hednesford 
 Rugeley 

Villages:
 Brereton
 Cannock Wood
 Hazelslade
 Heath Hayes and Wimblebury
 Norton Canes 
 Prospect Village
 Slitting Mill

Areas:
 Brindley Heath
 Broomhill
 Chadsmoor
 Chestall
 Church Hill
 Goosemoor Green
 Green Heath
 Hawks Green
 High Town
 Littleworth
 Little Wyrley
 North Lanes 
 Oldfallow
 Pye Green
 Rawnsley
 Rumer Hill
 Stoney Lea

Politics

Council political composition
The Labour Party controlled the district council from the 2012 election, when it gained an overall majority, until the 2019 election when the council entered no overall control. For the 2019/20 civic year, the Labour Party ran the council with an informal confidence-and-supply agreement with the Green Party. In June 2020, four Green councillors and a former Labour councillor formed the Chase Community Independents Group which led to Labour forming a minority administration with confidence and supply from two Liberal Democrat councillors and one former Labour independent councillor.

At the elections held in May 2021, the Conservatives won 12 of the 13 seats being contested (10 of which went to newly elected councillors), and in doing so, secured an outright majority on the Council.

The table below shows the number of seats held by each party since the beginning of 2010. This includes district council election results, highlighted in red, as well as defections and by-elections.

Cabinet members 2022/23

Shadow Cabinet members 2022/23

Footnotes

Further reading 
 

 
Non-metropolitan districts of Staffordshire